Plinthanthesis is a genus of Australian plants in the grass family.

 Species
 Plinthanthesis paradoxa (R.Br.) S.T.Blake - New South Wales, Victoria
 Plinthanthesis rodwayi (C.E.Hubb.) S.T.Blake - New South Wales
 Plinthanthesis urvillei Steud. - New South Wales

 formerly included
see Rytidosperma 
 Plinthanthesis tenuior - Rytidosperma tenuius

References

Danthonioideae
Endemic flora of Australia
Poales of Australia
Poaceae genera